Pinalia affinis is a species of plant within the orchid family.

References

affinis
Plants described in 1851